Mali Lipovec is a settlement in the hills to the east of Dvor in the Municipality of Žužemberk in southeastern Slovenia. The area is part of the historical region of Lower Carniola. The municipality is now included in the Southeast Slovenia Statistical Region.

References

External links
Mali Lipovec at Geopedia

Populated places in the Municipality of Žužemberk

hr:Mali Lipovec